Cathedral Preparatory School and Seminary is a Roman Catholic high school and seminary in Elmhurst, Queens in New York City.  It is operated by the Diocese of Brooklyn.  It is the last full-time high school seminary day school in operation in the United States.

History

Cathedral College 
In early 1914, Charles E. McDonnell, bishop of the Diocese of Brooklyn, decided that the diocese needed a minor seminary (high school seminary) to ensure a supply of priests. He appointed then Monsignor George Mundelein as the first rector of Cathedral College of the Immaculate Conception.  In September 1914, 110 students started classes in Cathedral College's temporary quarters at Saint John’s Chapel in the Fort Greene section of Brooklyn.  In December 1914, the diocese broke ground for the new campus in the Clinton Hill neighborhood in Brooklyn.

Cathedral College started operation as a six-year minor seminary, with a four-year high school track and a two-year college track. Upon completion of the six-year program, students continuing on to priesthood would be assigned to a major seminary.  Many other students went on to become members of religious orders, lawyers, doctors and teachers.

Cathedral Preparatory Seminary 
In 1963, Cathedral College opened a second location in Elmhurst;  it was called Cathedral Preparatory Seminary.  There were now two minor seminaries in the Diocese of Brooklyn.  In 1967, Cathedral College of the Immaculate Conception converted to a four-year college seminary and moved to Douglaston, New York. The Queens and Brooklyn campuses of Cathedral Preparatory Seminary were separated from the college.  Both campuses continued as four-year high school programs, operated by the Diocese of Brooklyn. The diocese closed the Brooklyn campus in 1985, leaving the Queens campus as the Cathedral Preparatory Seminary.

In 2002, the rector of Cathedral Prep, Monsignor Charles M. Kavanagh, was accused of sexual abuse by a former seminarian at the school.  The accuser, Daniel Donahue of Portland, Oregon claimed Kavanagh had made unwanted advances and touched him inappropriately in the 1980s, starting as an eighth grader at the seminary and continuing at Cathedral College. Donahue complained to the police and the diocese in 2002. Kavanagh denied all the charges. A review board from the Archdiocese of New York found him guilty in 2003.  Kavanagh appealed the decision, but a tribunal from another diocese affirmed the decision. After another appeal, a second tribunal said Kavanagh was guilty and should be defrocked.

Cathedral Preparatory School and Seminary 
Currently, students from both the Diocese of Brooklyn and the Diocese of Rockville Centre attend the school, as well as one student from the Archdiocese of New York. Since 1968, each summer Cathedral has hosted the Father Edward W. Troike Leadership Program for young men of 6th and 7th grades, as well as incoming freshmen.

Since 1914 nearly 4,500 students have received high school diplomas from Cathedral Prep. The school alumni include cardinals, bishops, priests, religious and laity.

Demographics
The demographic breakdown of the 132 boys enrolled for the 2013-2014 school year was:

Native American/Alaskan - 1.5%
Asian/Pacific islanders - 3.8%
Black - 3.8%
Hispanic - 34.1%
White - 53.8%
Multiracial - 3.0%

Notable alumni

 Vince Lombardi, National Football League coach
 Anthony Bevilacqua, archbishop-emeritus and cardinal of the Archdiocese of  Philadelphia
 John Carberry, archbishop emeritus and cardinal of the Archdiocese of St. Louis
Dennis Day, actor and singer
 Francis Mugavero, bishop of Brooklyn (1968-1990) 
 John McGann, bishop of the Diocese of Rockville Centre (1976-1999)
 John Dunne, auxiliary bishop of Rockville Centre
 Gerald Barbarito, bishop of the Diocese of Palm Beach
 Gregory Sierra, actor
 John Snyder, bishop-emeritus of the Diocese of St. Augustine, Florida
 Ignatius Catanello, auxiliary bishop-emeritus of Brooklyn 
 Peter Libasci, bishop of the Diocese of Manchester 
 Edward Scharfenberger, bishop of the Diocese of Albany
 Joseph A. Espaillat, auxiliary bishop of the Archdiocese of New York

Notes and references

External links
 School Website
 Alumni Website

Educational institutions established in 1914
Seminaries and theological colleges in New York City
Boys' schools in New York City
Roman Catholic Diocese of Brooklyn
Elmhurst, Queens
Roman Catholic high schools in Queens, New York
1914 establishments in New York City
Preparatory schools in New York City